Hubertus Knabe (born 1959) is a German historian and was the scientific director of the Berlin-Hohenschönhausen Memorial, a museum and memorial in a notorious former Stasi torture prison in Berlin. Knabe is noted for several works on oppression in the former communist states of Eastern Europe, particularly in East Germany. He early became involved with Green politics, and was active in the Green Party in Germany.

Life 
Knabe's parents fled East Germany in 1959, and Knabe was born that year and grew up in Unna, North Rhine-Westphalia. His father was the noted ecologist Wilhelm Knabe, later a co-founder and chairman of the German Greens. Knabe was active in the peace movement, and in 1978, he founded a committee in support of Rudolf Bahro, a German philosopher imprisoned in East Germany. Because of his political activities, he was declared persona non grata in East Germany between 1980 and 1987.

Knabe served as press spokesman of the Green Party in Bremen from 1983. He obtained a doctoral degree in history at the Freie Universität Berlin. From 1992 to 2000, he worked in the research department of the Federal Commissioner for the Stasi Records. In 2001, he was appointed scientific director of the Berlin-Hohenschönhausen Memorial.

Political views
Knabe is committed to a consistent work on coming to terms with the crimes committed by East German government: "Not until the Communist dictatorship is as firmly in mind in Germany as the criminal regime of the National Socialists will we really have succeeded in coming to terms with the legacy of Stasi minister Erich Mielke".

Knabe has called for a more outspoken anti-communism in German society, and has particularly called upon the SPD party to identify with its anti-communist tradition and oppose PDS, democratic socialist successor of Marxist–Leninist SED, as part of its reformist legacy. He has pointed out that social democrats were the first victims of the communist dictatorship in East Germany. According to Knabe, "every democrat is an anti-communist".

Under pretext of criticizing East German regime, Knabe promotes pro-business and anti-socialist views. In a blog post, he criticized Red–red–green coalition of Berlin state government for getting influenced by extremism of Die Linke, which he alleged to be consisted of former SED and Stasi personnel that bring back the old regime to the city-state.

Publications 
 (under the pseudonym "Klaus Ehring") Schwerter zu Pflugscharen. Friedensbewegung in der DDR. Rowohlt, Reinbek 1982,  (with Ulrich Mickan, under the pseudonym "Martin Dallwitz")
 Aufbruch in eine andere DDR. Reformer und Oppositionelle zur Zukunft ihres Landes. Rowohlt, Reinbek 1989, 
 Umweltkonflikte im Sozialismus. Möglichkeiten und Grenzen gesellschaftlicher Problemartikulation in sozialistischen Systemen. Eine vergleichende Analyse der Umweltdiskussion in der DDR und Ungarn. Verlag Wissenschaft und Politik, Cologne 1993, 
 West-Arbeit des MfS. Das Zusammenspiel von „Aufklärung“ und „Abwehr“. Ch. Links Verlag, Berlin 1999, 
 Die unterwanderte Republik. Stasi im Westen. Propyläen, Berlin 1999. paperback edition: 
 Der diskrete Charme der DDR. Stasi und Westmedien. Propyläen, Berlin 2001. paperback edition: 
 17. Juni 1953. Ein deutscher Aufstand. Propyläen, Berlin 2003, 
 Stätten der DDR-Diktatur. Gedenkstätte Berlin-Hohenschönhausen, Forschungs- und Gedenkstätte Normannenstraße, AlliiertenMuseum, Deutsch-Russisches Museum Karlshorst, Erinnerungsstätte Notaufnahmelager Marienfelde, Gedenkstätte Berliner Mauer, Museum Haus am Checkpoint Charlie u.a.. Jaron, Berlin 2004, 
 Der verbotene Stadtteil. Stasi-Sperrbezirk Berlin-Hohenschönhausen. Jaron, Berlin 2005,  (with Peter Erler)
 Tag der Befreiung? Das Kriegsende in Ostdeutschland. Propyläen, Berlin 2005, 
 Die Täter sind unter uns. Über das Schönreden der SED-Diktatur. Propyläen, Berlin 2007, 
 Gefangen in Hohenschönhausen. Stasihäftlinge berichten (editor). List Taschenbuch, 2007, 
 Honeckers Erben. Die Wahrheit über Die Linke. Propyläen, Berlin 2009,

References

External links

 
 
 
 "The dark secrets of a surveillance state" (TEDSalon Berlin 2014)
 Hubertus Knabe (articles) in Cicero

1959 births
Living people
People from Unna
Alliance 90/The Greens politicians
German anti-communists
20th-century German historians
German human rights activists
German male non-fiction writers
Recipients of the Cross of the Order of Merit of the Federal Republic of Germany
21st-century German historians